William John Carney (March 25, 1874 – July 31, 1938) was a Major League Baseball outfielder. Bill played two games in his career in 1904, with the Chicago Cubs. He went 0 for 7 in a doubleheader.

External links
Baseball Reference

Baseball players from Minnesota
Major League Baseball outfielders
Chicago Cubs players
1938 deaths
1874 births
Minor league baseball managers
Minneapolis Millers (baseball) players
Kansas City Blues (baseball) players
Dubuque Tigers players
Omaha Omahogs players
St. Joseph Saints players
St. Paul Apostles players
St. Paul Saints (Western League) players
Youngstown Little Giants players
Marion Glass Blowers players
Flandreau Indians players
Spokane Indians players
Fort Scott Giants players
Seattle Siwashes players
Fresno Raisin Growers players
Calgary Bronchos players
Rock Island Islanders players